No. 62 Squadron RNZAF was a radar squadron of the Royal New Zealand Air Force during the Second World War. The squadron was formed at Guadalcanal in August 1943 and comprised all the RNZAF radar units sent overseas. The Squadron was disbanded in October 1944.

History

In January 1943 the Americans were short on ground based radar equipment in the pacific and asked New Zealand to supply one of theirs. No. 52 unit was therefore established to install and operate a Ground-controlled interception radar system at Guadalcanal. The system was operational by 21 March and over the coming months further radar units (No.s 53–59) were formed and deployed to the Pacific. In August 1943 No. 62 Squadron was formed to bring all of the radar units under a unified command. The Squadron's units were deployed throughout the Solomon Islands, including Guadalcanal, Malaita, Bougainville Island, Rendova Island and New Georgia. The radar units provided fighter direction to USAAF fighter squadrons in the area and early warning of incoming Japanese air raids. By mid 1944 the radar units were no longer necessary due to the effective elimination of Japanese air power in the Solomons. As most of the RNZAF men had completed their tours of duty and American radar equipment and personnel in the Pacific was deemed adequate, No. 62 Squadron was disbanded in October 1944. Some of the radar units (Nos. 52, 53 and 58), however, continued to operate independently until February 1945. No. 62 Squadron was the only New Zealand Radar Squadron to serve overseas.

References

22
Squadrons of the RNZAF in World War II
Military units and formations established in 1943
Military units and formations disestablished in 1944